Belgium competed at the 1964 Winter Olympics in Innsbruck, Austria, returning to the Winter Games after missing the 1960 Winter Olympics.

Alpine skiing

Women

Bobsleigh

Speed skating

Men

References
 Official Olympic Reports
 Olympic Winter Games 1964, full results by sports-reference.com

Nations at the 1964 Winter Olympics
1964
Olympics